California Proposition 56 may refer to:

 California Proposition 56 (2004)
 California Proposition 56 (2016)